Ursa Dwarf may refer to:

Ursa Minor Dwarf
 Ursa Major I Dwarf, a satellite of the Milky Way Galaxy, discovered in 2005
 Ursa Major II Dwarf, a satellite of the Milky Way Galaxy, discovered in 2006
Palomar 4 star cluster, also called Ursa Major Dwarf